"My Neighbour's House" is the first single released by The Bluetones from their fifth album, The Bluetones, in 2006. It reached number 68 in the UK Singles Chart.

Track listing
CD
"My Neighbour's House"
"Your Psychotic Friend"
"South Thoresby"

7"
"My Neighbour's House"
"My Neighbour's Hardcore Belgian House"

The Bluetones songs
2006 singles
2006 songs
Songs written by Eds Chesters
Songs written by Adam Devlin
Songs written by Mark Morriss
Songs written by Scott Morriss